The Pincoya is, according to local mythology, a female "water spirit" of the Chilotan Seas. The Pincoya is said to have long blond hair, be of incomparable beauty, be cheerful and sensual, and rise from the depths of the sea.

Legends

Naked and pure, she personifies the fertility of marine species. Through her ritual dance she provides the chilote (resident of Chiloé) with an abundance or deficiency of fish and seafood. If she performs her dance facing the sea, it means that these shores will have an abundance of fish.  When she dances facing the mountains, her back to the sea, seafood will be scarce. Chiloean mythology is appreciative of the Pincoya, believed to be good, beautiful and humanitarian. According to other legends, Pincoya is the daughter of Millalobo (king of sea, in chilote mythology) and the human Huenchula. Her sister is the Sirena chilota (a type of Mermaid) and her brother is Pincoy (who also is her husband). The three siblings lead and guide the drowned sailors onto a large phantom ship, the Caleuche, sailing the seas at night around the southern island of Chiloé in southern Chile. The ship appears briefly intact with sounds of a party on board, but quickly vanishes. Myth has it that, once on board, the dead can resume an existence as if they were alive again.

Media
 The Pincoya appears various times in The Luke Coles Book Series by American author Josh Walker. She is first mentioned in Josh Walker's 2014 novel, Luke Coles and the Flower of Chiloe. In Luke Coles and the Forest Assassin she brings the spirits of shipwreck victims to the Caleuche before returning to the ocean. 
 It is also mentioned (along with this article) in Marisha Pessl's Night Film: A Novel.
 The Pincoya is a playable character in the roguelike platform action-adventure game Abyss Odyssey.

Scientific name use
In 2013, the newly discovered Pincoya Storm Petrel (Oceanites pincoyae) was named after Pincoya.

In 2019, star HD 164604 was officially named Pincoya after a poll organized by the NameExoWorlds campaign in Chile, during the 100th anniversary of the IAU.

References

 Martinez Vilches, Oscar, Chiloe Misterioso (in Spanish). Pub. Ediciones de la Voz de Chiloe (circa 1998)

Chilote legendary creatures
Chilote deities
Sea and river goddesses
Water spirits
Female legendary creatures